Jason Rüesch (born 16 May 1994) is a Swiss cross-country skier. He competed in 30 kilometre skiathlon at the 2022 Winter Olympics. He also had planned to compete at the 2018 Winter Olympics, but was forced to pull out due to health issues.

Cross-country skiing results
All results are sourced from the International Ski Federation (FIS).

Olympic Games

Distance reduced to 30 km due to weather conditions.

World Championships

World Cup

Season standings

Team podiums
 1 podium – (1 )

References

External links

1994 births
Living people
Swiss male cross-country skiers
Tour de Ski skiers
Cross-country skiers at the 2022 Winter Olympics
Olympic cross-country skiers of Switzerland
Cross-country skiers at the 2012 Winter Youth Olympics
People from Davos
Sportspeople from Graubünden